This is a list of prime ministers of Madagascar, since the establishment of the office of chief minister in 1828, during the Merina Kingdom.

List of officeholders
Political parties

Other factions

Status

See also
 Politics of Madagascar
 List of Imerina monarchs
 List of colonial governors of Madagascar
 List of presidents of Madagascar
 Vice President of Madagascar
 First Lady of Madagascar

Notes

External links
 World Statesmen – Madagascar

Madagascar, Prime Minister of
Government of Madagascar
 
 
Prime Ministers
Prime Ministers